The following is a timeline of the history of the city of Dublin, Ireland.

Prior to 16th century

 431 - Palladius is ordained the first bishop of Ireland by Pope Celestine I. He is later banished by the King of Leinster.
 c.450 - Christianity was expanded by St Patrick. 
 841 AD – Viking camp established.
 1014 – Battle of Clontarf.
 1028 – Christ Church founded (approximate date).
 1171 – Henry II of England in power. 
 1172 – Dublin "given charter and made centre of English Pale."
 1176 - Strongbow, earl of Pembroke leader of the Anglo-Norman forces, dies in Dublin.
 1185 – St Catherine's Church built.
 1190 – Fire.
 1191 – St Patrick's Cathedral construction begins.
 1192 - Prince John, Lord of Ireland grants the citizens of Dublin by charter the ability to form guilds."
 1204 - John, King of England grants a licence to the corporation of Dublin to hold an annual eight-day fair in Dublin, henceforth it is known as Donnybrook Fair.
 1207 - John, King of England grants a charter to the inhabitants of Dublin. 
 1229 – Richard Muton becomes first Lord Mayor of Dublin.
 1230 – Dublin Castle built.
 1283 – Fire.
 1348 – Black Death.
 1394 - Richard II of England enters Dublin with 30,000 bowmen, 4000 cavalry and the crown jewels. 
 1446 – Weavers' Guild chartered.
 1466 - Ireland's first public clock was installed on the tower of the Tholsel

16th-17th centuries
 1534 - Lord Thomas Fitzgerald, better known as Silken Thomas organised a rebellion and was executed in Tyburn two years later.
 1541 – Dublin becomes capital of the Kingdom of Ireland.
 1592 – Trinity College founded.
 1597 – 11 March: Dublin Gunpowder Disaster.
 1635 – Theatre built.
 1646 – City besieged by Parliamentarians.
 1649 – Siege of Dublin
 1661 – Dublin Corporation (city government) established.
 1662
 Smock Alley Theatre opens.
 Royal Hunting Park established.
 1664
 Saint Stephen's Green enclosed by a wall.
 Newman coffeehouse in business.
 1666 – Cabbage Garden cemetery in use.
 1680 – Hibernian Catch Club founded (approximate date).
 1681 – A new Tholsel building was constructed near Christchurch to house the activities of Dublin Corporation
 1682 – Weavers' Guild hall built in The Coombe.
 1683 – Dublin Philosophical Society founded.

18th century

 1702 – State Paper Office established in Dublin Castle.
 1707 – Marsh's Library incorporated.
 1708 – The Registry of Deeds is established by an Irish Act of Parliament entitled "An Act for the Publick Registering of all Deeds, Conveyances and Wills that shall be made of any Honors, Manors, Lands, Tenements or Hereditaments". The Registry is initially based in Dublin Castle.
 1709 – St. Luke's Church built.
 1710 – Mansion House (residence) built.
 1725 – Dublin Weekly Journal begins publication.
 1731 – Dublin Society founded.
 1742 – 13 April: Premiere of Handel's Messiah.
 1745 – Dublin Lying-In Hospital and Phoenix Park open.
 1748 – Leinster House built.
 1750 – Daly's Club active (approximate date).
 1751 – Royal Hibernian Hotel established.
 1753 – Parliament Street laid out.
 1757 – Wide Streets Commission established.
 1759 – Guinness brewery in business.
 1761 – Dublin Magazine begins publication.
 1770
 City directory published.
 Trinity College Historical Society founded.
 1771 - City Assembly House built.
 1779 – Royal Exchange built.
 1783 – Bank of Ireland in business.
 1784 – Royal College of Surgeons in Ireland founded.
 1785 – Royal Irish Academy established.
 1791
 Society of United Irishmen Dublin branch founded.
 Dublin Library Society instituted.
 Apothecaries Hall incorporated.
 Custom House built.
 1792
 Fitzwilliam Square laid out.
 The Flapper begins publication.
 1793 – Dublin Stock Exchange founded.
 1794 – Carlisle Bridge constructed.
 1796 – Four Courts built.

19th century
 1801 – City becomes part of the United Kingdom of Great Britain and Ireland.
 1802 - Completion of the Four Courts, Ireland's most prominent courts building.
 1804
 Grand Canal constructed.
 Cork Street Fever Hospital opens.
 1809 – Nelson's Pillar erected.
 1815 – Tenter House built on Cork Street.
 1817
 Royal Canal constructed.
 Cobourg Gardens open.
 1818
 General Post Office inaugurated.
 Mountjoy Square constructed.
 1821 – Population: 185,881.
 1822 – 12 December: Storm.
 1824 – Shelbourne Hotel in business.
 1828 – Kings Bridge constructed.
 1829 – Museum of the Royal Irish Academy established (approximate date).
 1830 – Royal Zoological Society of Ireland founded.
 1831 – Dublin Zoo opens.
 1832 – Dublin Penny Journal and Paddy Kelly's Budget begin publication.
 1833 – Dublin University Magazine begins publication.
 1838 – Glasnevin Model Farm established.
 1839
 Adelaide Hospital founded.
 The Citizen begins publication.
 1842 – The Nation newspaper begins publication.
 1843 – Dublin University Philosophical Society active.
 1846 – All Hallows cemetery in use.
 1854 – Catholic University of Ireland founded.
 1857 – Natural History Museum opens.
 1858 – St Catherine's Church dedicated on Meath Street.
 1861 – Wellington Monument erected.
 1865 – Royal College of Science for Ireland founded.
 1871 – Gaiety Theatre opens.
 1872 – Dublin tramways begin operating.
 1873 – Irish Monthly begins publication.
 1877
 National Museum of Ireland established.
 Dublin Metropolitan School of Art active.
 1879
 Star of Erin Music Hall opens.
 Butt Bridge constructed.
 1880 – St. Stephen's Park Temperance Hotel in business.
 1882 – 6 May: Phoenix Park Murders.
 1889 – Davy Byrne's pub in business.
 1891 – Dublin United Transport Company formed.
 1894 – New Ireland Review begins publication.
 1895 – Shelbourne Football Club formed.
 1898 – Dublin Port and Docks Board established.

20th century

 1901
 Jammet Restaurant in business.
 Population: 290,638. 
 1904 – Abbey Theatre opens.
 1905 – Irish Independent newspaper begins publication.
 1907 – Irish International Exhibition held.
 1909 – Volta Picture Theatre opens.
 1913
 Croke Park stadium opens.
 Dublin Lock-out begins.
 1916 – April: Easter Uprising.
 1918 – 15 December: Death of Molly Malone
 1919 – 21 January: First Dáil (parliament) convenes in Mansion House.
 1921 – 25 May: Burning of the Custom House.
 1922
 June–July: Battle of Dublin.
 December: City becomes capital of the newly formed Irish Free State.
 December: Oireachtas (parliament) begins meeting in Leinster House.
 Dublin Opinion begins publication.
 1923 – The Dublin Magazine begins publication.
 1928 – Gate Theatre founded.
 1930 – City boundaries expanded.
 1934 – Old Dublin Society founded.
 1937 – City becomes capital of the newly formed Republic of Ireland.
 1938 – Dublin Historical Record begins publication.
 1940
 26 August: Bombing of Dublin in World War II by German forces begins.
 The Bell (magazine) begins publication.
 1941
 31 May: North Strand Bombing
 Dublin Airport terminal built.
 Saint Mary's College for Domestic Science opens.
 1949 – Envoy, A Review of Literature and Art begins publication.
 1951 – Hotel strike.
 1953 – City boundaries expanded.
 1954 – 16 June: Bloomsday begins.
 1960 – Population: 468,103.
 1966
 8 March: Nelson's Pillar bombed.
 Project Arts Centre established.
 Garden of Remembrance opens.
 1972 – 1 February: British Embassy in Merrion Square destroyed by protesters.
 1973 – Grapevine Arts Centre founded.
 1974
 Dublin and Monaghan bombings
 Wood Quay excavation begins.
 1975 – Accountancy and Business College founded.
 1978 – Talbot Memorial Bridge constructed.
 1979 – Dublin City Archives established.
 1981 – Restaurant Patrick Guilbaud in business.
 1983
 Dublin Pride begins.
 Dublin Food Co-op founded.
 1984
 Dublin Area Rapid Transit begins operating.
 East-Link Bridge opens.
 1987
 International Financial Services Centre, Dublin Bus, and Irish Traditional Music Archive founded.
 Northside People newspaper begins publication.
 1988 – Kerlin Gallery opens.
 1989 – Dublin City University active.
 1991
 Institute of European Affairs founded.
 Irish Museum of Modern Art opens.
 1992
 Irish Film Institute opens.
 Dublin Institute of Technology established.
 1996 – National Print Museum of Ireland opens.
 1999 – Dublin European Institute founded.
 2000 – Dublin Writers Festival begins.

21st century

 2001 – Dublin Corporation renamed Dublin City Council.
 2002 – George's Quay Plaza built.
 2003
 Jameson Dublin International Film Festival begins.
 Spire of Dublin erected.
 James Joyce Bridge opens.
 2004 – Dublin Gay Theatre Festival begins.
 2006 – Dublin Port Tunnel opens.
 2009
 27 February: 2009 Bank of Ireland robbery
 Dublinbikes launched.
 Samuel Beckett Bridge opens.
 2010
 November: 2010 student protest in Dublin.
 Grand Canal Theatre and Convention Centre Dublin opens.
 2011
 May: Queen Elizabeth II's visit
 October: Occupy Dame Street begins.
 The Little Museum of Dublin opens.
 Population: 525,383.

See also

 History of Dublin
 Historical Maps of Dublin
 List of Mayors of Dublin

References

Bibliography

Published in the 18th century

Published in the 19th century

1800s-1840s 
 
 
 
 
 
 
 
 
  + Historical Annals of the City of Dublin

1850s-1890s 
 
 
 
 
  + v.2,  v.3 + Index

Published in the 20th century

1900s-1940s

1950s-1990s

Published in the 21st century

External links

  List of archival repositories in Dublin.
 Digital Public Library of America. Works related to Dublin, various dates
 Europeana. Items related to Dublin, various dates.

 
dublin
Dublin (city)-related lists
Dublin